Foolishness of His Love is a 1929 German silent film directed by Olga Chekhova and starring Michael Chekhov, Dolly Davis, and Alice Roberts.

The film's art direction was by Andrej Andrejew.

Cast

References

Bibliography

External links 
 

1929 films
Films of the Weimar Republic
German silent feature films
Terra Film films
German black-and-white films
1920s German films